Mourad Didouche (1927–1955 in Kabyle: Diduc Muṛad, Arabic: ديدوش مراد ) was a veteran of the Algerian War of independence (1954–1962).

Biography 

Mourad Didouche, nicknamed si Abdelkader, was born on July 13, 1927 at El Mouradia in Algiers in a family originally from the village of Ibskriène, Aghribs in Kabylia. He did his primary and the junior school in El Mouradia then joined the technical High School of Algiers(Ruisseau).

Two years later, while working as a railway agent to the Algiers Central Station and militant of the CGT, he was appointed head of the neighborhoods of El Mouradia, El Madania and Bir Mourad Rais, creating in 1946 the troupe Scouts "al -Amal" and the sports team "al- Sarie Riadhi" of Algiers.

In 1947, he organized the municipal elections in his area and also traveled to western Algeria to organize the campaign for the Algerian Assembly. Arrested in a raid, he managed to escape from the court.

Since the creation in 1947 of the Special Organization (OS), he was one of the founding and most active members.

Following the dissent of "Rehaim" on March 18, 1950 and the dismantling of a large part of the organization's network, resulting in the arrest of 130 people and the discovery of his responsibilities within the structure, and after the failure of the French administration to capture him, a judgment was entered against him in absentia and sentenced him to 10 years in prison. In 1952, with Ben Boulaïd he created the core of a clandestine movement in Algiers, whose mission was to make bombs in anticipation of the outbreak of the "National Revolution".

During the crisis of 1953-54 and the opposition of the Central Committee of the PPA- MTLD to Messali El Hajj, he went to France with the mission to control the Federation. Upon his return to Algiers, he created with eight companions, the revolutionary comity of Unity and action. He also participated in the meeting of "22" held in June 1954, during which it was decided the outbreak of the Revolution. Of this meeting emerged the first "Revolutionary Council" composed of six members Didouche Mourad, was appointed head of zone II ( Wilaya II). Yves Courrière nicknamed him the "Saint - Just of the Algerian revolution " 1.

He was one of the most prominent writers of the Declaration of 1 November 1954 and managed with the help of his assistant Zighoud Youcef to lay the groundwork for a political-military organization.

On January 18, 1955, when he was not yet 28 years old, Mourad Didouche died at the Battle of Douar Souadek,(Conde- Smendou) near Constantine. He was the first zone leader to fall.

The Didouche Mourad county, formerly Bizot, is named in his tribute. It is located on the National 3 between Constantine and commume of Zighoud Youcef. In his tribute as well; a major boulevard ("rue Michelet“ formerly, that starts on the heights of Algiers (at the Bardo Museum) and ends at the Place Maurice Audin) in central Algiers is named after him.

1-source, yves courriere.
2-mustapha manane

See also
 Declaration of 1 November 1954

References

1927 births
1955 deaths
Algerian revolutionaries
People of the Algerian War